Perkins Township may be either of the following places in the United States:
Perkins Township, Maine
Perkins Township, Erie County, Ohio

Township name disambiguation pages